Clean Ponds is a 1965 Soviet drama film directed by Aleksey Sakharov.

Plot 
The film tells about four friends who grew up on clean ponds, not even suspecting that they would become participants in the war.

Cast 
 Aleksandr Zbruyev as Sergei
 Tamara Syomina as Anna
 Svetlana Svetlichnaya as Katya
 Lyudmila Gladunko as Zhenya
 Yevgenia Filonova as Nina 
 Vladimir Yevstafyev as Os'ka
 Nina Agapova as Kul'chitskaya
 Nikolai Kryukov as Rzhanov
 Nina Menshikova as Sergei's mother
 Vyacheslav Nevinny as sailor

References

External links 
 

1965 films
1960s Russian-language films
Soviet drama films
1965 drama films
Mosfilm films
Soviet black-and-white films
Films set in Moscow
Films based on works by Yuri Nagibin